The 1928 football season has both the USC Trojans and the Georgia Tech Golden Tornado claim national championships. USC was recognized as champions under the Dickinson System, but the Rose Bowl was contested between the No. 2 and No. 3 Dickinson-rated teams, California and Georgia Tech. The game was decided by a safety scored after Roy "Wrong Way" Riegels ran 65 yards in the wrong direction. Vance Maree blocked the ensuing punt which gave Georgia Tech a safety deciding the 8–7 win.

The Florida Gators led the nation in scoring as a team, led by its "Phantom Four" backfield, with 336 points. They were remembered by many sports commentators as the best Florida football team until at least the 1960s.  NYU halfback Ken Strong led the nation in scoring  as an individual, with 162 points, and tallied some 3,000 total yards from scrimmage.

Conference and program changes

Conference changes
 Six conferences began play in 1928:
 Arkansas Intercollegiate Conference – an NAIA Division I conference active through the 1995 season; its former members now largely comprise the NCAA Division II Great American Conference
Big Six Conference – an NCAA Division I–A conference active through the 1996 season; founded after the original Missouri Valley Intercollegiate Athletic Association disbanded in May 1928 with six of its former members (Iowa State, Kansas, Kansas State, Missouri, Nebraska, and Oklahoma); later known as the Big Eight Conference after adding Oklahoma A&M and Colorado and a predecessor to the present-day Big 12 Conference
Central Intercollegiate Athletic Conference – an NAIA conference active through the 1968 season
Kansas Collegiate Athletic Conference –  an active NAIA conference; separate from the previous conference with the same name that disbanded after the 1927 season
Mississippi Valley Conference – active through the 1934 season
Missouri Valley Conference – an NCAA Division I-A conference active through the 1985 season; founded by the four remaining members of the former MVIAA (Drake, Grinnell, Oklahoma A&M, and Washington University in St. Louis) and independent Creighton; a separate entity from the present-day Missouri Valley Football Conference
 One conference played its final season in 1928:
 Oklahoma Intercollegiate Conference – active since the 1914 season; a separate conference with the same name would exist within the NAIA between the 1974 and 1996 seasons; largely replaced by the Oklahoma Collegiate Athletic Conference between the 1929 and 1974 seasons

Membership changes

September

September 29 

Army beat Boston University 35–0.
New York University (NYU) beat Niagara College 21–0.
Pennsylvania def Ursinus 34–0.
California beat Santa Clara 22–0 and USC beat Utah State, 40–12.
Texas beat its crosstown neighbor, Austin's St. Edward's College, 32–0.

October

October 6 

Nebraska opened its season with a 12–0 win at Iowa State.
Army narrowly beat the visiting SMU Mustangs, 14–13.
NYU beat West Virginia Wesleyan, 26–7.
Pennsylvania def. Franklin & Marshall 46–0.  Texas beat Texas Tech 12–0.
After losing 2 games out of 3 to non-college opponents, Stanford won at Oregon 26–12; USC beat visiting Oregon State 19–0.  California beat St. Mary's, 7–0
Wisconsin beat visiting Notre Dame, 22–6.  Georgia Tech beat VMI, 13–0.  Illinois beat Bradley, 33–6.  Iowa played a Sunday game against Monmouth College, winning 26–0.

October 13 

Stanford beat visiting UCLA 45–7, and California beat Washington State, 13–3.  USC defeated St. Mary's, 19–6.

In New Orleans, Georgia Tech beat Tulane, 12–0, and in Dallas, Texas narrowly lost to Vanderbilt, 13–12.
Pennsylvania shut out Swarthmore 67–0.
NYU defeated Fordham* 34–7.
Army shut out Providence 44–0.  Nebraska beat Montana State, 26–6.
Iowa won at Chicago, 13–0, while Illinois hosted Iowa's Coe College, winning 31–0
Wisconsin hosted Cornell College of Iowa, and North Dakota State University, with the varsity winning the first game 49–0, and the reserves beating the Dakotans 13–7.

October 20 

In Berkeley, California and USC played to a 0–0 tie.  With the exception of this game, USC played all of its other contests at home in Los Angeles in 1928.

Georgia Tech shut out Notre Dame at home, 13–0.  
Army won at Harvard 15–0.
NYU beat Rutgers* 48–0.
Pennsylvania recorded its fourth shutout, beating Penn State 14–0.
In San Francisco, Stanford beat Idaho, 47–0.
Wisconsin and Purdue tied 19–19, and Illinois beat Indiana 13–7.  Iowa beat Ripon College, 61–6.  Nebraska edged visiting Syracuse, 7–6.   Texas beat Arkansas, 20–7.
After its first two wins over Ashland College (65–0) and Thiel (38–13), Carnegie Tech beat Washington & Jefferson, 19–0.

October 27 

Army won at Yale, 18–6.
NYU beat Colgate 47–6.
Pennsylvania (4–0–0) was upset by (1–3–0) Navy, 6–0.  Prior to that, Penn had outscored its opponents 161–0.  USC beat Occidental 19–0.
Stanford beat Fresno State, 47–0.
Wisconsin won at Michigan, 7–0, and Iowa beat Minnesota, 7–6, while Illinois beat Northwestern 6–0.
Carnegie Tech beat Pittsburgh, 6–0.  Georgia Tech yielded its first points, winning at North Carolina, 20–7.  Nebraska shut out Missouri, 24–0, and Texas won at Rice, 13–6.  California lost to the Olympic Club of San Francisco, 12–0.  Olympic, nominally an amateur team of former college players, had beaten Stanford 12–6 earlier.

November

November 3 

In Los Angeles, USC (4–0–1) and Stanford (5–2–0) met, with the Trojans winning 10–0.
Wisconsin beat visiting Alabama, 15–0, while 4–0–0 Illinois suffered its first loss, at Michigan, 3–0.
California beat Oregon, 13–0.  Nebraska won at Kansas, 20–0.  Texas lost to visiting SMU, 6–2.
Pennsylvania won at Chicago, 20–13.
NYU and Georgetown University, both 5–0–0, with the Hoyas winning 7–2.
Army beat Indiana's DePauw College, 38–12.  Iowa defeated visiting South Dakota, 19–0.
Carnegie Tech extended its streak, with a 32–0 win over Westminster College of Pennsylvania, and Georgia Tech beat visiting Oglethorpe College 32–7.

November 10 

Army (6–0–0) hosted Notre Dame(4–2–0).  A crowd of 90,000 packed the stands while 5,000 others in the Bronx watched from roofs and fire escapes within view of Yankee Stadium.  Though the Fighting Irish weren't having a good year, the score was 0–0 when Knute Rockne inspired his team at halftime by relating George Gipp's deathbed wish ("When the team's up against it, when things are wrong and the breaks are beating the boys—tell them to go in there with all they've got and win just one for the Gipper").  Though Army scored a touchdown in the third quarter, touchdowns by Jack Chevigny and Johnny O'Brien gave the Irish a 12–6 lead.  In the final minute, Army drove to within one foot of the goal line, but the whistle sounded before the Cadets could snap the ball.

In the New York Daily News the following Monday, reporter Francis Wallace first related the story in an article entitled, "Gipp's Ghost Beat Army."

The big game in the South was in Atlanta, where Vanderbilt (6–0–0) visited Georgia Tech (5–0–0), and the home team won 19–7.  Texas won at Baylor, 6–0.

Wisconsin defeated Chicago, 25–0, and Iowa won at Ohio State, 14–7.  In Indianapolis, Illinois beat Butler, 14–0.

Pennsylvania won at Harvard, 7–0 NYU beat Alfred University, 71–0.  USC beat Arizona, 78–7, Stanford beat Santa Clara 31–0, and California won at Washington, 6–0.  Carnegie Tech won at Georgetown, 13–7.

Nebraska, which had not played Oklahoma during the last two seasons, renewed a rivalry that became one of the most notable in college football.  Playing at Oklahoma, the Cornhuskers won 44–6.

November 17 

Iowa (6–0–0) hosted Wisconsin (6–0–1) in a meeting of unbeatens, with the visitors handing the Hawkeyes their first loss, 13–0.  Illinois won at Chicago, 40–0.
Georgia Tech beat Alabama at home, 33–13.
Nebraska (6–0–0) hosted the (5–2–0) Pitt Panthers, and were tied, 0–0.
Pennsylvania beat Columbia 34–7  NYU beat Missouri, 27–6.  Army beat Carleton, 32–7.  Texas beat a strong TCU team, 6–0.
USC won again, defeating Washington State, 27–13, while Stanford beat Washington, 12–0, California rolled over visiting Nevada, 60–0.
(6–0–0) Carnegie Tech won at (5–2–0) Notre Dame, 27–7.

November 24 

Carnegie Tech (7–0–0) and NYU (7–1–0) met at Pittsburgh.  The Violets handed Tech its first defeat, 27–13. Ken Strong gained widespread fame. He threw two long touchdown passes, rushed for two touchdowns, and kicked three extra points, leading Grantland Rice to write:This attack was led by a runaway buffalo, using the speed of a deer, and his name was Ken Strong. He ran all over a big, powerful team, smashed its line, ran its ends, kicked 50 and 55 yards, threw passes and tackled all over the lot.  Today he was George Gipp, Red Grange and Chris Cagle rolled into one human form and there was nothing Carnegie Tech had that could stop his march.

Carnegie Tech coach Walter Steffen said of Strong's performance: "This is the first time in my career that one man was good enough to run over and completely wreck an exceptionally good team. I can tell you he is better than Heston or Thorpe."

Georgia Tech crushed visiting Auburn, 51–0.  Auburn won only 1 of its 9 games, and scored in only two of those contests.

Army (7–1–0) and Nebraska (6–0–1) met at West Point, with the Cadets beating the visiting Cornhuskers, 13–3.
Stanford and California tied at Berkeley, 13–13.  USC beat Idaho, 28–7.

November 29 

On Thanksgiving Day, Pennsylvania beat Cornell 49–0.  Overall, the Penn Quakers had outscored their opponents 271 to 26, and finished 8–1–0.  NYU closed its season with a 25–13 loss to visiting Oregon State, and finished 8–2–0.
Wisconsin hosted Minnesota, and suffered its first loss, a 6–0 defeat, to close at 7–1–1.  After starting the season 6–0, Iowa closed with a second loss, at Michigan, 10–7, to finish 6–2–0.  Illinois closed at 7–1–0 after beating visiting Ohio State, 8–0.  Nebraska closed its season with an 8–0 win over Kansas State, and Texas wrapped with a 19–0 win over Texas A&M.

December 1 

Army and Stanford met at Yankee Stadium, with Stanford shutting the Cadets out, 26–0.  In Los Angeles, USC hosted Notre Dame, winning 27–14, to close its season at 9–0–1.

December 8 

Georgia Tech hosted Georgia and won 20–6, closing regular play at 9–0, before the Yellow Jackets' trip to the Rose Bowl.  The Jackets finished 7–0 in Southern Conference play, assuring themselves of at least a share of the conference title.

In one of the final games of the 1928 season, once-tied Tennessee hosted unbeaten Florida in Knoxville.  For coach Charlie Bachman's Florida Gators, a share of the Southern Conference title was at stake; coach Robert Neyland's Tennessee Volunteers were playing for pride.  Tennessee edged Florida, 13–12.  Florida finished 8–1, Tennessee 9–0–1, and unbeaten and untied Georgia Tech won the conference championship outright.

Rose Bowl

As the lone post-season college football game, the Rose Bowl matched the California Golden Bears, co-champions (with USC) of the Pacific Coast Conference, against the Georgia Tech Yellow Jackets, nicknamed the "Golden Tornado" as well as the "champions of the South".  In the second quarter, the Jackets were on their own 25 yard line, when Warner Mizell fumbled the football.  Playing linebacker, California center Roy Riegels scooped up the fumble at the 34 and dashed, unimpeded, toward the end zone.  Unfortunately, Riegels had gotten turned around and ran downfield toward the California goal.  Though Riegels was not tackled in his own end zone, California chose to punt from there on first down, and Benny Lom's kick was blocked by Tech's Tom Jones, and Cal's Stan Barr fell on the ball for the safety.  Georgia Tech's 2–0 lead at halftime was extended to 8–0 after Stumpy Thomason ran for 15 yards for a score, and the conversion failed.  Lom's pass to Irv Phillips, and Barr's extra point, made it 8–7 with a minute left.  An onside kick attempt failed, and Georgia Tech ran out the clock to win the other national championship.

Conference standings

Major conference standings

Independents

Minor conferences

Minor conference standings

Dickinson System
The AP sportswriters' poll would not begin continuously until 1936. (although, the first time was a one instance publishing in 1934)  Frank G. Dickinson, an economics professor at the University of Illinois, had invented the Dickinson System to rank colleges based upon their records and the strength of their opposition.  The system was originally designed to rank teams in the Big Nine (later the Big Ten) conference.  Chicago clothing manufacturer Jack Rissman then persuaded Dickinson to rank the nation's teams under the system, and awarded the Rissman Trophy to the winning university.

The system awarded 30 points for a win over a "strong team", and 20 for a win over a "weak team".  Losses were awarded points (15 for loss to a strong team, 10 for loss to a weak team).  Ties were treated as half a win and half a loss (22.5 for a tie with a strong team, 15 for a tie with a weak team).  An average was then derived by dividing the points by games played.

Final Dickinson rankings
Professor Dickinson concluded that the University of Southern California Trojans were "the national football champions of America for 1928".  Unbeaten and untied Georgia Tech was ranked third because, Dickinson said, "its schedule was easier than the other contenders". On January 4, 1929, the Jack F. Rissman national intercollegiate trophy was presented by Professor Dickinson to the USC football squad, and Coach Howard Jones, at a student rally on the Los Angeles campus.  For the benefit of the crowd, Dickinson added "that even had he taken into consideration the victory of Georgia Tech over California on New Year's Day that the University of Southern California would have still be rated at the top," though Georgia Tech would have ranked second instead of third after its Rose Bowl win

Awards and honors

All-Americans

The consensus All-America team included:

Statistical leaders
Team scoring most points: Florida, 336 to 44.
Player scoring most points: Ken Strong, NYU, 162
Total offense leader: Ken Strong, NYU, 3000

References